Bang Pla Ma is a district (amphoe) in the southern part of Suphan Buri province, central Thailand.

History
The district was established in 1897 by the governor Phra Samutkhananurak (พระสมุทรคณานุรักษ์).

The name Pla Ma is the Thai name of the fish species Boesemania microlepis, which is found a lot in the area of the district.

Geography
Neighboring districts are (from the east clockwise) Phak Hai and Bang Sai of Ayutthaya province, Song Phi Nong, U Thong and Mueang Suphan Buri of Suphan Buri Province.

The main water resource of the district is the Tha Chin river or Suphan river.

Administration

Central administration 
The district Bang Pla Ma is subdivided into 14 subdistrict (tambon), which are further subdivided into 127 administrative villages (muban).

Local administration 
There are 7 subdistrict municipalities (thesaban tambon) in the district:
 Ban Laem Phatthana consisting of parts of the subdistrict Ban Laem.
 Khok Khram consisting of parts of the subdistrict Khok Khram.
 Bang Pla Ma consisting of parts of the subdistrict Bang Pla Ma.
 Ban Laem consisting of parts of the subdistrict Ban Laem.
 Phai Kong Din consisting of parts of the subdistrict Phai Kong Din.
 Ton Kram consisting of parts of the subdistrict Khok Khram.
 Takha consisting of the complete subdistrict Takha.

There are 11 subdistrict administrative organizations (SAO) in the district:
 Bang Pla Ma consisting of parts of the subdistrict Bang Pla Ma.
 Bang Yai consisting of the complete subdistrict Bang Yai.
 Kritsana consisting of the complete subdistrict Kritsana.
 Sali consisting of the complete subdistrict Sali.
 Phai Kong Din consisting of parts of the subdistrict Phai Kong Din.
 Ongkharak consisting of the complete subdistrict Ongkharak.
 Chorakhe Yai consisting of the complete subdistrict Chorakhe Yai.
 Makham Lom consisting of the complete subdistrict Makham Lom.
 Wang Nam Yen consisting of the complete subdistrict Wang Nam Yen.
 Wat Bot consisting of the complete subdistrict Wat Bot.
 Wat Dao consisting of the complete subdistrict Wat Dao.

Kao Hong market
Kao Hong market is an old market and community feels like a time machine with an atmosphere of at least one hundred years old, similar to Sam Chuk market of Sam Chuk district. Kao Hong market is a two-storey old wooden market by the Tha Chin river where people in the community continue to live their traditional ways of life as simple as in the past. Its name meaning "nine-room house" or "nine-shophouses" which is an ancient Thai wooden house with a long history opposite the market. Its founded by Chinese merchant named Hong or Boonrod Liangwanich in 1934, who survived the robbery at his bustling raft shop-cum-house but his wife was killed. He therefore founded the bandit watch tower in the middle of the market, considered as the only tower for the bandits of the province and the country. It is as tall as a six-story building (including the deck) and is considered a highlight and a landmark of this market. This market is divided into three zones according to its direction, namely Talat Lang (lower market), Talat Klang (middle market), and Talat Bon (upper market). In the past, it used to be a waterfront Thai Chinese community similar to floating market since King Rama V's reign. There was a pier with water buses running from here along the river until reaching Bangkok. Nowadays there are only few household of local food and traditional Chinese sweet shops. With its old and classic, therefore making it a location for filming many movies and TV dramas.  This market is open every day but will be lively on Saturdays and Sundays with public holidays only.

References

Bang Pla Ma